The Frostating was an early Norwegian court.  It was one of the four major Things in medieval Norway.  The Frostating had its seat at Tinghaugen in what is now the municipality of Frosta in Trøndelag county, Norway.  The name lives on in the present day Frostating Court of Appeal in Norway.

Tinghaugen
Tinghaugen, from the Old Norse words  meaning 'assembly' and  meaning 'hill', is close to the medieval church at Logtun. The site is represented by the Frostatinget bautasten at Tinghaugen. Frostating was arguably Norway's oldest court, pre-dating the Viking period. When Norway was united as a kingdom, the existing lagtings (law assemblies) were constituted as superior regional assemblies, Frostating being one of them. These were representative assemblies at which delegates from the various districts in each region met to award legal judgments and pass laws.

Magnus Lagabøtes landslov
The first seeds of democratic evolution appeared in matters of law. The ancient regional assemblies – Frostating, Gulating, Eidsivating, and Borgarting – were eventually joined into a single jurisdiction, and King Magnus Lagabøte had the existing body of law put into writing (1263–1280) as Magnus Lagabøtes landslov. This compilation of codified law which applied throughout the realm was exceptional for its time, and remained in force until Frederik III, king of the Dano-Norwegian personal union, promulgated absolute monarchy in 1660. This was codified in the King Act of 1665 which functioned as the Constitution of Norway of the Union of Denmark-Norway until 1814.

King Magnus Lagabøte carried out a great effort to modernize the law-code, which gave him his epithet, Magnus the law-mender. In 1274, Magnus promulgated the new national law, a unified code of laws to apply for the Kingdom of Norway, including the Faroe islands and Shetland. This replaced the different regional laws which had existed before. A unified code of laws for a whole country had until then only been introduced in the Kingdom of Sicily in the Liber Augustalis promulgated in 1231 by Frederick II, Holy Roman Emperor and the  compiled during the reign of Alfonso X of Castile.

Frostating seal 
The Frostating seal shows king Magnus Lagabøte seated on his throne and giving the lawman the new Frostating law at the Frostating. The seal commemorates Magnus's great effort to modernise the law-code. The representatives to the Thing—three deep—stand on the king's left side. The king sits in the middle on his throne with a crown on his head and a scepter in his hand, and with the Norwegian lion under his foot. Below in the seal are two bowmen; one aiming at a squirrel while the other aims at a bird. Both the squirrel and the bird sit in trees. The original of the Frostating seal is in the Diplomatarium Norvegicum, a source collection of Norwegian letters and documents from earliest recorded history until 1570. The seal is found on a document dated 1 June 1453, in Dipl. Norv. VIII no. 349 .  A variation of this seal has lived on the coat of arms of Frosta.

See also 
 Frostathing Law
 Medieval Scandinavian law

References

Footnotes

Literature

Related Reading

External links
Diplomatarium Norvegicum

Legal history of Norway
Frosta
Thing (assembly)